Anna Lembke (born November 27, 1967) is an American psychiatrist who is Chief of the Stanford Addiction Medicine Dual Diagnosis Clinic at Stanford University. She is a specialist in the opioid epidemic in the United States, and the author of Drug Dealer, MD, How Doctors Were Duped, Patients Got Hooked, and Why It’s So Hard to Stop. Her latest book, a New York Times bestseller, Dopamine Nation: Finding Balance in the Age of Indulgence, was released in August 2021.

Lembke appeared in the 2020 Netflix documentary The Social Dilemma.

Early life and education 
Lembke was an undergraduate student at Yale University, graduating with a B.A. in humanities in 1989. She earned her M.D. at Stanford University School of Medicine in 1995 and completed her residency in psychiatry, also at Stanford, in 1998. She interned at the Alameda County Highland Hospital, specializing in adult psychiatry and addiction. She was board certified in 2003.

Research and career 
At Stanford University School of Medicine, Lembke is Professor and Medical Director of Addiction Medicine. She is also Program Director of the Stanford Addiction Medicine Fellowship and Chief of the Stanford Addiction Medicine Dual Diagnosis Clinic. The mission of Stanford's Dual Diagnosis Clinic is to support patients with substance use disorders, behavioral addictions, and co-occurring psychiatric disorders.

Lembke wrote the popular science book, Drug Dealer, MD and traveled around the United States and delivered expert testimony to legislators. She has also delivered a TED talk on the opioid epidemic and pain management at TEDx Stanford.

Lembke has studied addiction in relation to substances like drugs and alcohol, but she has taken special interest in addictions to smartphones and other technology. However, smartphone and technology "addictions" are not currently recognized as formal clinical disorders in the Diagnostic and Statistical Manual of Mental Disorders (DSM-5) or in the International Classification of Diseases (ICD-10 and ICD-11). Despite this, Lembke believes that smartphones are not only addictive on their own, but she purports that smartphones can exacerbate the problems of other addiction behaviors by increasing access and social contagion.  Lembke appeared in the 2020 Netflix docudrama The Social Dilemma, in which she argued that "social media is a drug" that exploits the brain's purported evolutionary need for interpersonal connection. Lembke's children also appeared in the film, and the family commented that they believe most people significantly underestimate their screen time.

Select publications

References 

Living people
American addiction physicians
Stanford University faculty
Opioids in the United States
American women psychiatrists
American psychiatrists
Yale University alumni
Stanford University School of Medicine alumni
21st-century American women
1967 births